Guadeloupe issued stamps from 1884 using French colonies stamps overprinted with G.P.E or GUADELOUPE. The first definitives for Guadeloupe were issued in 1892. Guadeloupe has used stamps of France since 1947.

References

Communications in Guadeloupe
Guadeloupe